Raya and Sakina were two Egyptian women serial killers, known as Egypt's most infamous murderers of that type. Raya and Sakina were siblings. They, their husbands, and two other men began killing women in the Labban neighborhood of Alexandria in the early 1900s. The police were plagued by increasing reports of missing women. Common details in the reports included the missing person's sex (all were females), the missing women were known to be wearing gold jewelry, and were known to be carrying a large amount of money. Another common detail was the report that many of the missing women were last seen with both or either one of the two sisters. Sakina was questioned several times because of the reports, but she managed to dodge any suspicions about her involvement.

On the morning of 11 December 1920, a passerby discovered human remains on the side of the road; the body was damaged beyond recognition (except for its long hair) and was completely dismembered. There was also a piece of black cloth and a striped black-and-white pair of socks near the body, however, these items did not help with the identification of the remains. In an unrelated incident, at about the same time in December, a man reported finding human remains beneath his floor while digging to fix a water pipe.

Those findings provided the only evidence regarding the murders in the Labban neighbourhood. After investigation, it was found that Raya and Sakina had been renting a home beside El Labban police department, where the bodies were buried, at the time when the women and girls disappeared. Also, they were friends with the El Labban police department. 

Raya, Sakina and their husbands were tried for murder. All four were convicted and were sentenced to death on 16 May 1921. Raya and Sakina became the first Egyptian women to be executed by the modern state of Egypt.

Crimes 
The six criminals were Raya and her husband Hasb-Allah, Sakina and her husband Mohamed Abd El-'Al, in addition to two other men Orabi Hassan, and Abd El-Razik Yossef. Between 20 December 1919 and 12 November 1920, the gang of Raya and Sakina murdered 17 women. The victims were prostitutes who used to work in the "secret home" (brothel) that was managed by Raya and Sakina. Most of the victims knew Raya and Sakina and had been friends with them for years. After luring a victim to one of the four homes, they would offer her wine and liquor until she became inebriated. The four men would then attack the victim and constrain her movement. One would hold her ankles, one would surround her chest with his arms, and a third would hold her head tightly while the fourth suffocated her by forcibly placing a wet cloth on her mouth and nose until she stopped breathing. They would then steal her jewelry, money, and clothes. Afterwards, the men would remove the tiles of the floor, dig a hole, bury the corpse in it, and reset the tiles.

The two sisters sold the stolen jewelry to a local jeweler, Ali Hasan, and divided the money among the six criminals.

Crime scenes 
Four homes where the crimes had been committed were all located near Mansheya Square.  Most of the victims came from this area.

The addresses of the homes:

No. 5 Makoris Street, near the Labban Bakery.
No. 38 Ali Bey Elkebeer Street.
No. 7 El Negah Lane.
No. 8 El Negah Lane.

Raya and Sakina in the media 
Inspired by the story of the Raya and Sakina, many books and works of art have been published.

Raya and Sakina a film production from 1953 that stars Negma Ibrahim, Zouzou Hamdy El-Hakim, Farid Shawki, Anwar Wagdi, Shoukry Sarhan, Samira Ahmed and Berlanti Abdel Hamid, and was directed by Salah Abu Seif.
Ismail Yasin meets Raya and Sakina a film production from 1955 that stars Ismail Yasin, Negma, Zouzou Hamdy El-Hakim, Abdel Fattah Qasri and Reyad El Kasabgy, and was directed by Hamada Abdel Wahab.
Raya and Sakina a film production from 1983 that stars Sharihan, Younis Shalabi and Hassan Abdeen.
Raya and Sakina the theatrical production from 1985 that starred Sohair El Babli, Shadia, Abdel Moneim Madbouly and Ahmed Bedier.
Raya and Sakina, a television series that ran in 2005, it stars Abla Kamel, Somaya El Khashab, Sami Al Adel, Ahmed Maher, Salah Abdallah, and Ryad El Khoury, and was directed by Gamal Abdel Hamid.
There was also a television program entitled: Raya and Sakina, presented by Hala Fakher and Ghada Abdel Razek.

References

External links

Raya and Sakina Internet Movie Database.
Stinging Sisters

1921 deaths
1919 murders in Egypt
1920 murders in Egypt
20th-century criminals
20th-century Egyptian people
20th-century Egyptian women
20th-century executions by Egypt
Criminal duos
Executed Egyptian female serial killers
Executed Egyptian people
Egyptian people convicted of murder
People convicted of murder by Egypt
People executed by Egypt by hanging
Year of birth missing